Soul of Reason was a talk radio show focused on African American arts and culture, hosted by Roscoe Brown from 1971 to 1986 on WNYU-FM, with rebroadcast on WNBC and at times WNBC-FM.

Background

Production

Topics

Guests

Preservation

References

External links
 Transforming a Collection into Data 
 Archives data

1970s American radio programs
1971 radio programme debuts
1980s American radio programs
1986 radio programme endings
African-American radio
American talk radio programs
New York University
Radio in New York City